Arrhenothrips is a genus of thrips in the family Phlaeothripidae.

Species
 Arrhenothrips acuminatus
 Arrhenothrips brevis
 Arrhenothrips dhumrapaksha
 Arrhenothrips longisetis
 Arrhenothrips marieps
 Arrhenothrips pauliani
 Arrhenothrips ramakrishnae

References

Phlaeothripidae
Thrips
Thrips genera